Hov1 is the self-titled debut studio album by Swedish hip-hop group Hov1. It was released on 28 April 2017 through Universal Music. The album proved successful in Sweden, peaking at number one on the Swedish Albums Chart. As of 1 May 2020, the album has charted for a total of 153 weeks in the country. The album was produced by Axel Liljefors Jansson, Björn Hallberg and Martin Tjärnberg. All songs were written by Hov1. Hov1 charted at the Album year-end chart in Sweden in 2017, 2018 and 2019, charting at position 3, 5 and 26, respectively. It has also been certified 2× platinum in the country.

Track listing

Personnel
Adapted from Tidal.

 Axel Liljefors Jansson – producer, composing, songwriting
 Aryan Marzban – mixing  
 Björn Hallberg  – producer , composing 
 Martin Tjärnberg – producer, mixing, composer 
 Dante Lindhe  – vocals, songwriting
 Ludwig Kronstrand – vocals, songwriting
 Noel Flike – vocals, songwriting

Charts

Weekly charts

Year-end charts

Release history

References

2017 debut albums
Hip hop albums by Swedish artists
Swedish-language albums
Universal Music AB albums